Finding Amanda is a 2008 comedy-drama film directed by Peter Tolan and starring Matthew Broderick and Brittany Snow. The plot revolves around a television producer with a penchant for drinking and gambling, who is sent to Las Vegas to convince his troubled niece to enter rehabilitation. It was filmed in California over a three-month period.

Plot
Working as a television writer for a low-rated sitcom, Those McAllisters, Taylor Peters (Matthew Broderick) has developed a few vices, such as drinking, drug abuse and compulsive gambling, which have previously damaged his career to the extent that he takes sessions with an analyst only so his wife Lorraine (Maura Tierney) can feel he is taking the cure. Adding to this stressful home life is the discovery that their 20-year-old niece Amanda (Brittany Snow) has run away from home to Las Vegas to work as a prostitute. Although he writes a good comic scene for his lead actor Ed Begley, Jr., Taylor still has the need to run off to the track to play the horses, his only vice, but when his wife discovers it and threatens him with divorce, Taylor agrees to go to Amanda and try to get her into a rehab community in Malibu. Taylor goes to Las Vegas and locates Amanda and realizes that, even though she is involved in a dangerous profession, she has accumulated wealth and retained a relatively refined attitude about life. During the rescue, Taylor's drinking and drug addiction returns and his relationship with his wife crumbles, but he learns a large lesson about life and bonds with Amanda, entreating her to make some positive choice about her own life.

Cast
Matthew Broderick as Taylor Peters Mendon
Brittany Snow as Amanda Tangerman
Peter Facinelli as Greg
Maura Tierney as Lorraine Mendon
Steve Coogan as the Casino Pit Boss
Daniel Roebuck as Link
Bill Fagerbakke as Larry
J. P. Manoux as Tony
Jennifer Hall as Wendy
Allie McCulloch as Eve
Kate Micucci as thin girl (uncredited)

Reception
On review aggregator website Rotten Tomatoes, the film holds a 40% rank based on 43 reviews, with an average rating of 5.1/10. The site's critic's consensus states: "Despite a charming turn by Matthew Broderick, Finding Amanda is too flimsily executed to succeed as a dark comedy". On Metacritic, Finding Amanda has a score of 51 out of a 100 based on 17 critics, indicating "mixed or average reviews".

Ronnie Scheib of Variety wrote "Matthew Broderick regains his cinematic stride as a morosely wise-cracking television producer on the skids, ably abetted by Maura Tierney as his much-put-upon wife and Brittany Snow as his perky prostitute niece".

Mark Olsen of Los Angeles Times said that "[the film is w]ritten with more bite, the premise might hold up, but as executed here by Tolan, is a soft-hearted, haphazard mess".

Mick LaSalle of San Francisco Chronicle weighed the comments, writing that "Finding Amanda has some of the good and a lot of the bad aspects of a first film written and directed by the same person".

Slant Magazines Nick Schager called the film a "clumsy mashup of Leaving Las Vegas and Hardcore". while Cynthia Fuchs of PopMatters mentioned that "Too much of Peter Tolan's movie takes up Taylor's self-absorption as if it's actually interesting".

Not every critic panned this film. Roger Ebert of the Chicago Sun-Times said that according to him, the film is "peculiar",

Stephen Holden of The New York Times was of the same view. He wrote "Finding Amanda offers a vision of confused Americans losing their already shaky bearings in the world's gaudiest honky-tonk".

References

External links

2008 comedy-drama films
American independent films
Films with screenplays by Peter Tolan
Films directed by Peter Tolan
American comedy-drama films
Magnolia Pictures films
Midlife crisis films
2008 directorial debut films
2008 independent films
2000s English-language films
2000s American films